The 2017 Davidson Wildcats football team represented Davidson College in the 2017 NCAA Division I FCS football season. They were led by fifth-year head coach Paul Nichols and played their home games at Richardson Stadium. They were members of the Pioneer Football League. They finished the season 2–9, 0–8 in PFL play to finish in last place.

On November 27, head coach Paul Nichols was fired. He finished at Davidson with a five-year record of 7–43.

Schedule

Source: Schedule

Game summaries

Brevard

at Western Carolina

Guilford

Marist

at Jacksonville

at Stetson

Dayton

at Drake

Campbell

San Diego

at Morehead State

References

Davidson
Davidson Wildcats football seasons
Davidson Wildcats football